The human brain anatomical regions are ordered following standard neuroanatomy hierarchies. Functional, connective, and developmental regions are listed in parentheses where appropriate.

Hindbrain (rhombencephalon)

Myelencephalon
Medulla oblongata 
Medullary pyramids
Arcuate nucleus
Olivary body 
Inferior olivary nucleus
Rostral ventrolateral medulla
Caudal ventrolateral medulla
Solitary nucleus (Nucleus of the solitary tract)
Respiratory center-Respiratory groups
Dorsal respiratory group
Ventral respiratory group or Apneustic centre
Pre-Bötzinger complex
Botzinger complex
Retrotrapezoid nucleus
Nucleus retrofacialis
Nucleus retroambiguus
Nucleus para-ambiguus
Paramedian reticular nucleus
Gigantocellular reticular nucleus
Parafacial zone
Cuneate nucleus
Gracile nucleus
Perihypoglossal nuclei
Intercalated nucleus
Prepositus nucleus
Sublingual nucleus
Area postrema
Medullary cranial nerve nuclei
Inferior salivatory nucleus
Nucleus ambiguus
Dorsal nucleus of vagus nerve
Hypoglossal nucleus
Chemoreceptor trigger zone

Metencephalon
Pons
Pontine nuclei
Pontine cranial nerve nuclei
Chief or pontine nucleus of the trigeminal nerve sensory nucleus (V)
 Motor nucleus for the trigeminal nerve (V)
 Abducens nucleus (VI)
 Facial nerve nucleus (VII)
 Vestibulocochlear nuclei (vestibular nuclei and cochlear nuclei) (VIII)
Superior salivatory nucleus
Pontine tegmentum
Pontine micturition center (Barrington's nucleus)
Locus coeruleus
Pedunculopontine nucleus 
Laterodorsal tegmental nucleus
Tegmental pontine reticular nucleus
Nucleus incertus
Parabrachial area
Medial parabrachial nucleus
Lateral parabrachial nucleus
Subparabrachial nucleus (Kölliker-Fuse nucleus)
Pontine respiratory group 
Superior olivary complex
Medial superior olive
Lateral superior olive
Medial nucleus of the trapezoid body
Paramedian pontine reticular formation
Parvocellular reticular nucleus
Caudal pontine reticular nucleus
Cerebellar peduncles
Superior cerebellar peduncle
Middle cerebellar peduncle
Inferior cerebellar peduncle
Fourth ventricle
Cerebellum
Cerebellar vermis
Cerebellar hemispheres
Anterior lobe
Posterior lobe
Flocculonodular lobe
Cerebellar nuclei
Fastigial nucleus
Interposed nucleus
Globose nucleus
Emboliform nucleus
Dentate nucleus

Midbrain (mesencephalon)

Tectum
Corpora quadrigemina
Inferior colliculi
Superior colliculi
Pretectum
Tegmentum
Periaqueductal gray
Rostral interstitial nucleus of medial longitudinal fasciculus
Midbrain reticular formation
Dorsal raphe nucleus
Red nucleus
Ventral tegmental area
Parabrachial pigmented nucleus
Paranigral nucleus
Rostromedial tegmental nucleus
Caudal linear nucleus
Rostral linear nucleus of the raphe
Interfascicular nucleus
Substantia nigra
Pars compacta
Pars reticulata
Interpeduncular nucleus
Cerebral peduncle
Crus cerebri
Mesencephalic cranial nerve nuclei
Oculomotor nucleus (III)
Edinger-Westphal nucleus
Trochlear nucleus (IV)
Mesencephalic duct (cerebral aqueduct, aqueduct of Sylvius)

Forebrain (prosencephalon)

Diencephalon

Epithalamus
Pineal body (pineal gland)
Habenular nuclei
Stria medullaris
Taenia thalami

Third ventricle
 Subcommissural organ
 Circumventricular organs (also Fourth ventricle)

Thalamus

Anterior nuclear group
Anteroventral nucleus ( ventral anterior nucleus)
Anterodorsal nucleus
Anteromedial nucleus
Medial nuclear group
Medial dorsal nucleus
Midline nuclear group
Paratenial nucleus
Reuniens nucleus
Rhomboidal nucleus
Intralaminar nuclear group
Centromedian nucleus
Parafascicular nucleus
Paracentral nucleus
Central lateral nucleus
Lateral nuclear group
Lateral dorsal nucleus
Lateral posterior nucleus
Pulvinar
Ventral nuclear group
Ventral anterior nucleus
Ventral lateral nucleus
Ventral posterior nucleus
Ventral posterior lateral nucleus 
Ventral posterior medial nucleus
Metathalamus
Medial geniculate body
Lateral geniculate body
Thalamic reticular nucleus

Hypothalamus (limbic system) (HPA axis)
Anterior
Medial area
Parts of preoptic area 
Medial preoptic nucleus
INAH 1
INAH 2
INAH 3
INAH 4
Median preoptic nucleus
Suprachiasmatic nucleus
Paraventricular nucleus
Supraoptic nucleus (mainly)
Anterior hypothalamic nucleus 
Lateral area
Parts of preoptic area 
Lateral preoptic nucleus
Anterior part of Lateral nucleus 
Part of supraoptic nucleus
Other nuclei of preoptic area
Median preoptic nucleus
Periventricular preoptic nucleus
Tuberal
Medial area
Dorsomedial hypothalamic nucleus 
Ventromedial nucleus 
Arcuate nucleus
Lateral area
Tuberal part of Lateral nucleus 
Lateral tuberal nuclei
Posterior
Medial area
Mammillary nuclei (part of mammillary bodies) 
Posterior nucleus
Lateral area
Posterior part of Lateral nucleus
 Surface
 Median eminence
 Mammillary bodies
 Pituitary stalk (infundibulum)
Optic chiasm
Subfornical organ
Periventricular nucleus
Tuber cinereum
Tuberal nucleus 
Tuberomammillary nucleus
Tuberal region
Mammillary nucleus

Subthalamus (HPA axis) 
Subthalamic nucleus
Zona incerta

Pituitary gland (HPA axis)
Neurohypophysis
Pars intermedia (Intermediate Lobe)
Adenohypophysis

Telencephalon (cerebrum) Cerebral hemispheres

White matter
Centrum semiovale
Corona radiata
Internal capsule
External capsule
Extreme capsule

Subcortical
 Hippocampus (Medial Temporal Lobe)
Dentate gyrus
Cornu ammonis (CA fields)
Cornu ammonis area 1 (CA1)
Cornu ammonis area 2 (CA2)
Cornu ammonis area 3 (CA3)
Cornu ammonis area 4 (CA4)
Amygdala (limbic system) (limbic lobe)
Central nucleus (autonomic nervous system)
Medial nucleus (accessory olfactory system)
Cortical and basomedial nuclei (main olfactory system)
Lateral and basolateral nuclei (frontotemporal cortical system)
Extended amygdala
Stria terminalis
Bed nucleus of the stria terminalis
Claustrum
Basal ganglia
Striatum
Dorsal striatum (a.k.a. neostriatum)
Putamen
Caudate nucleus
Ventral striatum
Nucleus accumbens
Olfactory tubercle
Globus pallidus (forms nucleus lentiformis with putamen)
Ventral pallidum
Subthalamic nucleus
Basal forebrain
Anterior perforated substance
Substantia innominata
Nucleus basalis
Diagonal band of Broca
Septal nuclei
Medial septal nuclei
Lamina terminalis
Vascular organ of lamina terminalis

Rhinencephalon (paleocortex)
Olfactory bulb
Olfactory tract
Anterior olfactory nucleus
Piriform cortex
Anterior commissure
Uncus
Periamygdaloid cortex

Cerebral cortex (neocortex)
Frontal lobe
Cortex
Primary motor cortex (Precentral gyrus, M1)
Premotor cortex
Supplementary motor cortex
Prefrontal cortex
Orbitofrontal cortex
Dorsolateral prefrontal cortex
Ventrolateral prefrontal cortex
Dorsomedial prefrontal cortex
Ventromedial prefrontal cortex
Gyri
Superior frontal gyrus
Middle frontal gyrus
Inferior frontal gyrus 
Brodmann areas: 4, 6, 8, 9, 10, 11, 12, 24, 25, 32, 33, 44, 45, 46, 47
Parietal lobe
Cortex
Primary somatosensory cortex (S1)
Secondary somatosensory cortex (S2)
Posterior parietal cortex
Gyri
Postcentral gyrus (Primary somesthetic area)
Other
Precuneus
Brodmann areas 1, 2, 3 (Primary somesthetic area); 5, 7, 23, 26, 29, 31, 39, 40
Occipital lobe
Cortex
Primary visual cortex (V1)
V2
V3
V4

Gyri
Lateral occipital gyrus
Other
Cuneus
Brodmann areas 17 (V1, primary visual cortex); 18, 19
Temporal lobe
Cortex
Primary auditory cortex (A1)
Secondary auditory cortex (A2)
Inferior temporal cortex
V5/MT
Posterior inferior temporal cortex
Gyri
Superior temporal gyrus
Middle temporal gyrus
Inferior temporal gyrus
Entorhinal cortex
Perirhinal cortex
Parahippocampal gyrus
Fusiform gyrus
Brodmann areas: 20, 21, 22, 27, 34, 35, 36, 37, 38, 41, 42
Other
Medial superior temporal area (MST)
Insular cortex
Cingulate cortex
Anterior cingulate
Posterior cingulate
Retrosplenial cortex
Indusium griseum
Subgenual area 25
Brodmann areas 23, 24; 26, 29, 30 (retrosplenial areas); 31, 32

Neural pathways
 Superior longitudinal fasciculus
 Arcuate fasciculus
 Uncinate fasciculus
 Perforant pathway
 Thalamocortical radiations
 Corpus callosum
 Anterior commissure
 Amygdalofugal pathway
 Interthalamic adhesion
 Posterior commissure
 Habenular commissure
 Fornix
 Mammillotegmental fasciculus
 Incertohypothalamic pathway
 Cerebral peduncle
 Medial forebrain bundle
 Medial longitudinal fasciculus
 Myoclonic triangle
 Solitary tract
 Major dopaminergic pathways from dopaminergic cell groups
 Mesocortical pathway
 Mesolimbic pathway
 Nigrostriatal pathway
 Tuberoinfundibular pathway
 Serotonergic pathways
Raphe Nuclei
 Norepinephrine Pathways
Locus coeruleus and other noradrenergic cell groups
 Epinephrine pathways from adrenergic cell groups
 Glutamate and acetylcholine pathways from mesopontine nuclei

Motor systems / Descending fibers
Extrapyramidal system
Pyramidal tract
Corticospinal tract or Cerebrospinal fibers
Lateral corticospinal tract
Anterior corticospinal tract
Corticopontine fibers
Frontopontine fibers
Temporopontine fibers
Corticobulbar tract
Corticomesencephalic tract
Tectospinal tract
Interstitiospinal tract
Rubrospinal tract
Rubro-olivary tract
Olivocerebellar tract
Olivospinal tract
Vestibulospinal tract
Lateral vestibulospinal tract
Medial vestibulospinal tract
Reticulospinal tract
Lateral raphespinal tract
Alpha system
Gamma system

Somatosensory system
 Dorsal column–medial lemniscus pathway
 Gracile fasciculus
 Cuneate fasciculus
 Medial lemniscus
 Spinothalamic tract
 Lateral spinothalamic tract
 Anterior spinothalamic tract
 Spinomesencephalic tract
 Spinocerebellar tract
 Spino-olivary tract
 Spinoreticular tract

Visual system
 Optic tract
 Optic radiation
 Retinohypothalamic tract

Auditory system
 Medullary striae of fourth ventricle
 Trapezoid body
 Lateral lemniscus

Nerves
Brain stem
Cranial nerves
Terminal (0) 
Olfactory (I)
Optic (II) 
Oculomotor (III)
Trochlear (IV) 
Trigeminal (V) 
Abducens (VI)
Facial (VII)
Vestibulocochlear (VIII)
Glossopharyngeal (IX) 
Vagus (X) 
Accessory (XI)
Hypoglossal (XII)

Neuro endocrine systems
Hypothalamic-pituitary hormones
HPA axis
HPG axis
HPT axis
GHRH - GH
Hypothalamic–neurohypophyseal system

Neuro vascular systems
Middle cerebral artery
Posterior cerebral artery
Anterior cerebral artery
Vertebral artery
Basilar artery
Circle of Willis (arterial system)
Blood–brain barrier
Glymphatic system
Venous systems
Circumventricular organs

Neurotransmitter pathways

Noradrenaline system
Dopamine system
Serotonin system
Cholinergic system
GABA
Neuropeptides
 Opioid peptides 
 Endorphins
 Enkephalins
 Dynorphins
 Oxytocin
 Substance P

Dural meningeal system
Cerebrospinal Fluid
Brain-cerebrospinal fluid barrier
Meningeal coverings
Dura mater
Arachnoid mater
Pia mater
Epidural space
Subdural space
Subarachnoid space
Arachnoid septum
Superior cistern
Cistern of lamina terminalis
Chiasmatic cistern
Interpeduncular cistern
Pontine cistern
Cisterna magna
Spinal subarachnoid space
Ventricular system
Lateral ventricles
Angular bundle
Anterior horn
Body of lateral ventricle
Inferior horn
Posterior horn
Calcar avis
Subventricular zone
Third ventricle
Fourth ventricle
Foramina
Interventricular Foramina
Cerebral Aqueduct
Foramina of Luschka
Foramen of Magendie

Limbic system
The limbic system, also known as the paleomammalian cortex, is a set of brain structures located on both sides of the thalamus, immediately beneath the medial temporal lobe of the cerebrum primarily in the midbrain. The classification of structures as part of the limbic system is historical and originates from the position of the structures at the boundary between two functionally distinct components (hence, the name limbus, meaning border) and the structures' shared roles in emotional processes (see limbic system for more details). Hence, there is overlap of structures in the limbic system and in other classifications of brain structures. The following areas have been considered part of the limbic system.

Cortical areas:
Limbic lobe
Orbitofrontal cortex: a region in the frontal lobe involved in the process of decision-making
Piriform cortex: part of the olfactory system
Entorhinal cortex: related to memory and associative components
Hippocampus and associated structures: play a central role in the consolidation of new memories
Fornix: a white matter structure connecting the hippocampus with other brain structures, particularly the mammillary bodies and septal nuclei
Subcortical areas:
Septal nuclei: a set of structures that lie in front of the lamina terminalis, considered a pleasure zone
Amygdala: located deep within the temporal lobes and related with a number of emotional processes
Nucleus accumbens: involved in reward, pleasure, and addiction
Diencephalic structures:
Hypothalamus: a center for the limbic system, connected with the frontal lobes, septal nuclei, and the brain stem reticular formation via the medial forebrain bundle, with the hippocampus via the fornix, and with the thalamus via the mammillothalamic fasciculus; regulates many autonomic processes
Mammillary bodies: part of the hypothalamus that receives signals from the hippocampus via the fornix and projects them to the thalamus
Anterior nuclei of thalamus: receive input from the mammillary bodies and involved in memory processing

Other areas that have been included in the limbic system include the:

Stria medullaris
 Central gray and dorsal and ventral nuclei of Gudden

Related topics
 Human brain
 Spinal cord
 Outline of the human nervous system
 List of nerves of the human body

References

External links
 High-Resolution Cytoarchitectural Primate Brain Atlases
 View information on various brain regions: images, name in seven languages, location, etc.
 Medical subject headings: Brain. View tree structures of the brain with the MeSH Tree Structures tab.

Brain
Cognitive science lists